The Monte Alpe (or La Rocca, or Monte Alpe Est, 1.056 m) is a mountain of the Ligurian Prealps, the eastern section of the Ligurian Alps.

Features 

The mountain stands between the comunes of Castelbianco and Erli, both in the provincia di Savona (Italy). It belongs to the Pennavaira/Neva; its prominence is of 151 metres. The Sella d'Alpe (938 m) divides the main summit of Monte Alpe, at an elevation of 1056 m, from a W summit at 1035 m. NW of this elevation the Neva/Pennavaira ridge goes on with Monte delle Gettine and Pizzo Castellino and, after the saddle of Passo delle Caranche, meets the main chain of the Alps at Monte Galero. Towards SE the ridge quickly drops, ending up close to the village of Marinetto, at the connfluence between the two rivers.

The summit of Monte Alpe is marked by a small cairn. The mountain is shrouded by thick woods which, both close to its main elevation and the W summit, leave places to grassland. On the Monte Alpe flanks there are several rock outcrops, some of them very steep or vertical and used by enthusiasts as a  climbing area. The lower slopes of the mountain are occupied by olive trees plantations and by other Mediterranean cultivations.

SOIUSA classification 
According to the SOIUSA (International Standardized Mountain Subdivision of the Alps) the mountain can be classified in the following way: 
 main part = Western Alps; major sector =  South Western Alps, section = Ligurian Alps, subsection = Prealpi Liguri
 supergroup = Catena Settepani-Carmo-Armetta, group = Gruppo Galero-Armetta, subgroup = Dorsale del Pizzo Castellino, code = I/A-1.I-A.3.b

Geology 
Monte Alpe, from a geological point of view, features limestone dating back to the Triassic era. The area located between Monte Alpe and Monte Galero is characterized by quite a high landslide risk.

Access to the summit 

Monte Alpe can be easily reached on foot following the ridge which connects it with Monte Galero. Others hiking routes start from Erli and Veravo (comune of Castelbianco).

Mountain bike 
The ascent to Monte Alpe is considered a mountain bike itinerary considered quite demanding, but very satisfactory too.

References

Bibliography

Maps 

 
 

One-thousanders of Italy
Mountains of Liguria
Mountains of the Ligurian Alps
Province of Savona